Belyaev is a lunar impact crater that is attached to the outer edge of the Mare Moscoviense, on the far side of the Moon. It is a worn formation  with a small crater pair overlaying the southern rim, and several smaller craters across the relatively irregular interior.

Satellite craters
By convention these features are identified on lunar maps by placing the letter on the side of the crater midpoint that is closest to Belyaev.

References

 
 
 
 
 
 
 
 
 
 
 
 

Impact craters on the Moon